The Pont au Double is a bridge over the Seine in Paris, France.

Location
The bridge links the 4th and 5th arrondissements of Paris, from the Île de la Cité to the quai de Montebello.

History 
In 1515, Francis I was asked to build a bridge over the small branch of the Seine in order to carry patients to the Hôtel-Dieu hospital on the Île de la Cité. Construction began in 1626 and in 1634 the two sides were connected.

In 1709, the bridge collapsed. It was rebuilt and remained in place until 1847. In 1883, the Pont au Double was replaced by a one arch cast-iron bridge.

External links

  French City Hall website
  Structurae
 Satellite view from Google Map

Double
Double
Buildings and structures in the 4th arrondissement of Paris
Buildings and structures in the 5th arrondissement of Paris
Double
Former toll bridges in France